Julius Mägiste (before 1922 Julius Mälson; 19 September 1900 – 11 March 1978) was an Estonian linguist.

He was born in Kassema village, Tartu County. In 1923 he graduated from the University of Tartu. Since 1925, he taught at the University of Tartu.

1934 and 1936, he was the head of Mother Tongue Society.

In 1944, he fled to Germany and in 1945 to Sweden in Lund. Until 1967, he taught Finno-Ugric languages at Lund University.

Publications

 "Estnisches etymologisches Wörterbuch" (manuscript, 12 editions)

References

External links

1900 births
1978 deaths
Linguists from Estonia
Estonian Finno-Ugrists
Hugo Treffner Gymnasium alumni
University of Tartu alumni
Academic staff of the University of Tartu
Academic staff of Lund University
Estonian World War II refugees
Estonian emigrants to Sweden
People from Tartu Parish